Świętosława is the name some historians have assigned a Polish princess, the daughter of Mieszko I of Poland and sister of Bolesław I of Poland, who married two Scandinavian kings.  According to German chroniclers, this princess, whose name is not given, was married first to Eric the Victorious of Sweden and then to Sweyn Forkbeard of Denmark, giving the former a son, Olof, and the latter two sons, Harald and Cnut. Because a documented sister of Cnut seems to have borne the Polish name Świętosława, it has been speculated that this may also have been the name of their mother, the Polish princess of the chroniclers.

The Icelandic sagas give her role as successive queen of these two monarchs to Sigrid the Haughty, daughter of Skagul Toste. This account is considered less reliable than the contemporary chroniclers by a number of scholars, according to Birgitta Fritz in Svenskt biografiskt lexikon, and the historical authenticity of Sigrid is viewed skeptically.  Snorre Sturlasson also mentions a Slavic princess he calls Gunhild of Wenden, daughter of king Burislav of the Wends, the ancient Slavs inhabiting the northern regions of modern Poland, and it has been suggested that Gunhild may be a somewhat confused account of the sister of the Polish king Bolesław I, described by the chroniclers.

Polish genealogist Rafał Prinke sees the German chroniclers as having combined the roles of two distinct wives of Sweyn Forkbeard, with the Polish princess actually being Gunhild, mother of Cnut, Harold and a daughter Świętosława, while he sees Sigrid the Haughty as an authentic subsequent wife of Sweyn as widow of Eric the Victorious, being mother of Eric's son, Olaf, and of Sweyn's daughter, Estrid. He further suggests although Świętosława was not the name of Sweyn's Polish wife, the name had a history in the family, that perhaps it was the name of the otherwise unknown wife of Mieszko's father, Siemomysł.

Contemporary sources 
There is scant material in medieval chronicles to provide details regarding the marriages of Sweyn of Denmark and Eric of Sweden:

 Thietmar of Merseburg mentions that the daughter of Mieszko I of Poland and sister of Bolesław I Chrobry of Poland married Sweyn Forkbeard and gave him two sons, Cnut the Great and Harald II of Denmark, but he does not mention her name. Thietmar is probably the best informed of the medieval chroniclers addressing the question, since he was contemporary with the events described and well-informed about the events in Poland and Denmark. The assertion that Harald's and Cnut's mother was Bolesław's sister may explain some mysterious statements which appear in medieval chronicles, such as the involvement of Polish troops in invasions of England.
 Adam of Bremen writes almost a century later that a Polish princess—the sister or daughter of Bolesław I Chrobry of Poland—was the wife of Eric the Victorious and by this marriage the mother of Olof Skötkonung of Sweden, before she became mother of Cnut the Great and Harald II of Denmark in her second marriage with Sweyn. Adam's claims about the marriage to Eric are considered unreliable by many historians, since he is the only source to state this relationship and because he is writing several generations later. The scholia of Gesta Hammaburgensis Ecclesiae Pontificum mentions that it was the Polish king Bolesław who gave the princess' hand in marriage. One problem is that Olof was born at latest in the early 980's, before Boleslaw Chrobry came to power, and therefore was too old to be the unnamed princess's son.
 Gesta Cnutonis regis mentions in one short passage that Cnut and his brother went to the land of the Slavs, and brought back their mother, who was living there. This does not necessarily mean that his mother was Slavic, but nevertheless this chronicle strongly suggests that she was.
 The "Liber vitae of the New Minster and Hyde Abbey Winchester" has an entry for a sister of king Cnut named "Santslaue" (Santslaue soror CNVTI regis nostri), which is seen as a Slavic name.  Based on this single mention of what would be her daughter and the supposition that the name in question represents the Old Polish name Świętosława found in a later generation of the Polish royal family, J. Steenstrup suggested that this child was named for her mother and hence the Polish wife of Eric and Sweyn was likewise named Świętosława, the name now generally used for her.

Bibliography
 Oswald Balzer, Genealogia Piastów, Kraków 1895.
 Włodzimierz Dworzaczek, Genealogia, Warsaw 1959
 Andrzej Feliks Grabski, Bolesław Chrobry. Zarys dziejów politycznych i wojskowych, Warsaw 1964.
 Kazimierz Jasiński, Rodowód pierwszych Piastów, Warsaw-Wrocław (1992).

References 

Polish princesses
Piast dynasty
House of Knýtlinga
House of Munsö
10th-century Polish people
11th-century Polish people
10th-century Polish women
11th-century Polish women
10th-century Danish people
11th-century Danish people
10th-century Danish women
11th-century Danish women
10th-century Norwegian people
11th-century Norwegian people
10th-century Norwegian women
11th-century Norwegian women
10th-century Swedish people
11th-century Swedish people
10th-century Swedish women
11th-century Swedish women
10th-century English people
11th-century English people
10th-century English women
11th-century English women
Danish royal consorts
Norwegian royal consorts
Swedish queens
English royal consorts
Remarried royal consorts